Heleno is a 2011 Brazilian biographical drama film directed by José Henrique Fonseca. It stars and was produced by Brazilian actor Rodrigo Santoro.

Plot
It tells the story of Heleno de Freitas (Rodrigo Santoro), a legendary football star who played for Botafogo during the 1940s. Most of all, Heleno's self-destructive behaviour turned him into a myth.

See also

List of black-and-white films produced since 1970

References

External links
 
 
 
 
 
 

2011 biographical drama films
2011 films
Brazilian association football films
Biographical films about sportspeople
Brazilian black-and-white films
Brazilian biographical drama films
Brazilian sports drama films
Films about syphilis
Films directed by José Henrique Fonseca
Films set in the 1940s
Films set in 1950
Films set in 1959
Films set in hospitals
2010s Portuguese-language films
Cultural depictions of association football players
Cultural depictions of Brazilian men
2011 drama films
2010s sports drama films